A Handful of Heroes is a 1967 West German-Italian historical war film directed by Fritz Umgelter and starring Horst Frank, Valeria Ciangottini and Karlheinz Fiege.

It is a remake of the 1930 film The Last Company about a detachment of Prussian soldiers who defend a vital outpost against Napoleon's armies around the time of the Battle of Jena (1806).

It was shot on location in Hungary using Eastmancolor.

Cast
 Horst Frank as Hauptmann Bruck
 Valeria Ciangottini as Angelika
 Karlheinz Fiege as Oberjäger Rückert
 Volkert Kraeft as Fahnenjunker Olberg
 Luigi Ciavarro as Steffen
 Martin Lüttge as Jäger Hinnerk
 Rolf Becker as Jäger Borgmann
 Jörg Pleva as Jäger Papke
 Franz Rudnick as Kanonier Kurtz
 Franco Fantasia as Steffen
 Ferenc Zenthe
 Géza Tordy
 György Bánffy
 János Csányi
 Géza Ferdinándy
 Erzsi Orsolya

References

Bibliography 
 Klossner, Michael. The Europe of 1500–1815 on Film and Television: A Worldwide Filmography of Over 2550 Works, 1895 Through 2000. McFarland & Company, 2002.

External links 
 

1967 films
1967 war films
1960s historical films
German war films
German historical films
Italian war films
Italian historical films
West German films
1960s German-language films
Films directed by Fritz Umgelter
Films set in 1806
Napoleonic Wars films
Films shot in Hungary
Remakes of German films
Constantin Film films
Films scored by Angelo Francesco Lavagnino
Siege films
Films with screenplays by Sergio Donati
1960s German films
1960s Italian films